Macropycnodon is an extinct genus of ray-finned fish which existed in New Mexico during the upper Cretaceous period.

References

Prehistoric ray-finned fish genera
Fossil taxa described in 2010
Natural history of New Mexico